Niels Christian Kaldau  (born 22 December 1974) is a male badminton player from Denmark.

Career
Kaldau won the Portuguese Badminton Champs in 1998, 2002 and 2003, the German Open in 2002,  the Bitburger Open in 2004 and the Spanish International Badminton Tournament in 2005.

He won the bronze medal at the 2006 European Badminton Championships in men's singles.

Achievements

IBF World Grand Prix 
The World Badminton Grand Prix sanctioned by International Badminton Federation (IBF) from 1983 to 2006.

Men's singles

IBF International 
Men's singles

References

External links
BWF Player Profile

Danish male badminton players
1974 births
Living people